Parran is an unincorporated community located at the crossroads of MD 263, Cox Road, and Emmanuel Church Road in Calvert County, Maryland, United States. Cornehill was listed on the National Register of Historic Places in 1973.

References

Unincorporated communities in Calvert County, Maryland
Unincorporated communities in Maryland